This is a list of The Little Mermaid adaptations. It is restricted to direct adaptations of Hans Christian Andersen's fairy tale, The Little Mermaid.

Print
 Classics Illustrated Junior (1950s), an American comic book series, published a print version in issue #525.
 Angel's Hill (Angel no Oka, 1960), a manga by Osamu Tezuka.
 My Love, My Love: Or The Peasant Girl (1985), a novel by Rosa Guy, is based on the Hans Christian Andersen tale and inspired the musical Once on This Island, set in the French Antilles.
 Princess Mermaid (2002), a print adaptation by Japanese artist Junko Mizuno as the third and final part of her "fractured fairy tales".
 The Mermaid's Madness (2010), a book adaptation by Jim C. Hines, in which the mermaid, Lirea, is on a quest of revenge on the human prince who denied her advances, having been driven insane due to a side effect of her transformation.
 The Little Android (2014), a short story adaptation by Marissa Meyer as part of The Lunar Chronicles series and appearing in the collection Stars Above. The main character is reinterpreted as an android named Mech6.0.
 The Mer Chronicles by Tobie Easton (2016-2019), a young adult novel series focusing on a distant relative of the Little Mermaid in modern times and her own romance with a human.
 The Little Mermaid (2017), a graphic novel adaptation by Metaphrog.
 To Kill a Kingdom (2018) by Alexandra Christo, a young adult novel in which the mermaid is sent to kill the prince but ends up falling in love with him.
 Skin of the Sea (2021), a young adult novel by Natasha Bowen that mixes the fable with West African religious traditions.

Film
 Hans Christian Andersen (1952) features a ballet segment adaptation within the film.
 Fantasia 3 (1966), a Spanish anthology film, opens with the adaptation segment "Coralina: La Doncella del Mar" starring Dyanik Zurakowska.
 The Daydreamer (1966), a Rankin/Bass film that combines live-action and stop-motion, features a stop-motion segment adaptation in the film.
 The Little Mermaid (1968), a 29-minute Soviet Union animated film by film studio Soyuzmultfilm and directed by Ivan Aksenchuk.
 Hans Christian Andersen's The Little Mermaid (Anderusen Dowa Ningyo Hime) (1975), an anime feature film directed by Tomoharu Katsumata.
 Rusalochka (Русалочка) (1976), a live-action film that was a joint production by the USSR and Bulgaria; directed by Vladimir Bychkov and starring Vyctoriya Novikova as the mermaid.
 Malá mořská víla (1976), a live-action Czech film directed by Karel Kachyňa and starring Miroslava Šafránková as the Mermaid, Radovan Lukavský as the King of the Ocean, Petr Svojtka as the prince, Milena Dvorská as the Sea Witch and Miroslava's sister, Libuše Šafránková, as the princess. It featured a score by Zdeněk Liška, eschewed the traditional visual of mermaids having fish tails and presented them more as water spirits.
 The Little Mermaid (1989), an animated film by Walt Disney Feature Animation and released by Walt Disney Pictures, starring Jodi Benson as the voice of Ariel. The film launched a franchise that was continued with a TV series of the same name (1992-1994), a sequel: The Little Mermaid II: Return to the Sea (2000), and a prequel: The Little Mermaid: Ariel's Beginning (2008).  
The Little Mermaid (1992), an animated film by Golden Films that was distributed by GoodTimes Entertainment.
 The Little Mermaid (1998), a 50-minute animated adaptation by Burbank Films Australia.
 Rusalka (2007), a Russian film by Anna Melikyan, set in modern-day Russia.
 Ponyo (2008), an animated Hayao Miyazaki film based loosely on the story.
 Little from the Fish Shop (2014), a modern-day stop-motion film adaptation by Czech artist Jan Balej.
 The Silver Moonlight (2015), an experimental film by Russian-born filmmaker Evgueni Mlodik, retelling the story of The Little Mermaid in the style of a 1930s German melodrama made under the Nazis.
 The Lure (2015), a Polish film based on the Hans Christian Andersen story.
 Little Mermaid (2017), an indie film set in the modern day with Rosie Mac as the titular character.
 The Little Mermaid (2018), an indie film based on the original Andersen fairytale set in Mississippi with Poppy Drayton as the titular character.
 The Little Mermaid (2023), A live-action remake directed by Rob Marshall starring Halle Bailey as Ariel. and Melissa McCarthy as Ursula.

Television
 Shirley Temple's Storybook (1961), a television anthology that broadcast a one-hour adaptation as an episode.
 Mahō no Mako-chan (1970), an anime television series based on the story, ran for 48 episodes.
 Andersen monogatari (1971), an anime television series based on Andersen's stories, as a three half-hour episodes adaptation.
 The Little Mermaid (1974), a 30-minute animated version presented by Reader's Digest magazine, narrated by Richard Chamberlain.
 Manga Sekai Mukashi Banashi (1976), an anime television series based on fairy tales and literature classics features a 10-minute adaptation.
 My Favorite Fairy Tales (Sekai Dōwa Anime Zenshū) (1986), an anime OVA anthology, has a 12-minute adaptation.
 Faerie Tale Theatre (1987), a television anthology produced by Shelley Duvall, has a one-hour live-action adaptation starring Pam Dawber as the mermaid, Treat Williams as the prince, Karen Black as the sea witch and Helen Mirren as the other princess.
 Adventures of the Little Mermaid (1991), an NHK anime television series adaptation that ran for 26 episodes.
 World Fairy Tale Series (Sekai meisaku dōwa shirīzu - Wa-o! Meruhen ōkoku) (1995), an anime series based on popular tales, as a half-hour adaptation.
 Happily Ever After: Fairy Tales for Every Child (1997), an animated television anthology series, has an East Asian-influenced retelling featuring the voices of Tia Carrere and Robert Guillaume.
 Pokémon: Indigo League (1998), an anime television series, broadcast episode 61, "The Misty Mermaid", that was inspired by the story.
 The Fairytaler (alternately titled as Tales from H.C. Andersen), a Danish animated television anthology, has a half-hour adaptation directed by Jorgen Lerdam in 2003. 
 Mermaid Melody Pichi Pichi Pitch (2002), an anime television series, was inspired by the story.
 Fairy Tale Police Department (2002), an Australian animated television series, has one episode that is based on the story.
 The Triplets (2003), features an adaptation which, in comparison to other animated versions, remains remarkably faithful to the story's melancholic tone and core elements (most notably its bittersweet ending) despite some minor changes. It was aired during the series' second season as episode #26 (#91 of the entire series).
 Queen's Blade (2009), A side-story focused on princess mermaids, Tiina of Seabed
 Simsala Grimm (2010), an animated German television anthology, broadcast a half-hour adaptation.
 Puella Magi Madoka Magica (2011), an anime series, has hints of "The Little Mermaid" in Sayaka Miki's story arc, which involves losing her unrequited crush to another girl and "losing her soul" in a sense, becoming a creature with a mermaid-like design.
 Once Upon a Time (2013), an ABC television series, uses characters and elements of the 1989 animated Disney film.
 Die kleine Meerjungfrau (2013), a live-action made-for-TV German adaptation directed by Irina Popow and starring Zoe Moore, part of the series Sechs auf einen Streich.
 The Idle Mermaid (2014), a South Korean television serial modern retelling that ran for 10 episodes.
 Betoolot (2014), an Israeli TV series that follows the story of a modern family in which all the females have the characteristics of being a mermaid. The series has 28 episodes in 3 seasons.
 Regal Academy (2018). In the second season of the series, the Little Mermaid appears as a recurring character.
 Tropical-Rouge! Pretty Cure (2021), an anime series part of the Pretty Cure franchise, uses Christian Andersen's fairy tale as a recurring theme. Laura La Mer, one of the main characters, and the Witch of Delays, the primary antagonist, are loosely based on the titular mermaid and the Sea Witch respectively.

Theatre
 Rusalka (1901), an opera with music composed by Dvořák, was first performed in Prague. It incorporates plot elements from the Andersen story and from de la Motte Fouqué's Undine (e.g. the Witch is from Andersen and the Water Goblin is from Fouqué).
 The Garden of Paradise (1914), a play written by Edward Sheldon.
 La Petite Sirène (1957), a three-act opera version by French composer Germaine Tailleferre, with a libretto adapted by Philippe Soupault.
 Once on This Island (1990) a musical based around the Andersen story.
 De Kleine Zeemeermin (2004), a stage musical adaptation by Studio 100 directed by Gert Verhulst, with music by Johan Vanden Eede. The show premiered in Belgium in 2004 starring Free Souffriau as the mermaid, and then transferred to the Netherlands where Kim-Lian and Kathleen Aerts portrayed the mermaid.
 The Little Mermaid (2005), a modern-rendition ballet by the Royal Danish Ballet, composed by Russian-American composer Lera Auerbach and choreographed by John Neumeier, premiered on 15 April 2005.
 The Little Mermaid (2008), a Broadway stage musical based on the 1989 Disney film, with music by Alan Menken and lyrics by Howard Ashman and Glenn Slater. The show premiered on 10 January 2008 at the Lunt-Fontanne Theatre.
 John Neumeier's The Little Mermaid (2010), a production of the San Francisco Ballet, premiered on 20 March 2010.
 Below (2013), a stage adaptation by Adapt Theatre Productions, a small fringe-theatre production company in Chicago, Illinois. The story is written in blank verse by actor/playwright Lane Flores and is from the perspective of the little mermaid's sisters, who have kidnapped the story's prince to judge his compassion for their deceased sister.
 The Little Mermaid (2013), a family show (play with music), dialogue by Joel Horwood, staged by Simon Godwin for the Bristol Old Vic, Bristol UK.
 The Little Mermaid (2013), a theatrical adaptation by Blind Tiger, a London-based Actor Musician theatre company, focuses on Hans Christian Andersen's influences when creating the fairytale. The show opened in December 2013 at Riverside Studios.
 The Little Mermaid (2017) a ballet with choreography by David Nixon and a score by Sally Beamish was staged by Northern Ballet in Leeds, Sheffield and other venues in the north of England in the winter of 2017 and 2018. Revived on tour 2022.

Audio
 Die Seejungfrau (The Mermaid, 1903), a 47-minute-long symphonic poem by Austrian composer Alexander von Zemlinsky.
 Tale Spinners for Children: The Little Mermaid (UAC 11042), an audio dramatization of the story with Denise Bryer and the Famous Theatre Company with music by Edvard Grieg.
 "Little Mermaid" (1982), a song by Japanese jazz-fusion band The Square (now known as T-Square), released on the album Magic.
 The Little Mermaid (Die kleine Meerjungfrau, 2007), an orchestral piece by Lior Navok for an actress, two pianos and a chamber ensemble/orchestra, premiered on 28 July 2007.
 "人魚姫/Ningyo Hime" ("The Little Mermaid") and "リトマメ/Rito Mame" ("Little Mermaid", 2009), a pair of songs produced using the Vocaloid software, based on the story.
 "Ningyo No Namida" ("Tears of the Mermaid", 2009), a song by Japanese visual kei band LM.C, is loosely based on the story.

References